Russell Metty, A.S.C. (September 20, 1906 – April 28, 1978) was an American cinematographer who won the Academy Award for Best Cinematography, Color, for the 1960 film Spartacus.

Career
Metty's career began around 1925 as an assistant with Standard Film Laboratory, who was then was hired by Paramount Pictures working in the camera department. He left for RKO in 1929. He became a regular cameraman at Universal Studios, and was a regular collaborator with the German film director Douglas Sirk, making eleven films altogether with Sirk.

Filmography

 West of the Pecos (1934)
 Night Waitress (1936)
 They Wanted to Marry (1937)
 Behind the Headlines (1937)
 You Can't Beat Love (1937)
 Forty Naughty Girls (1937)
 Annapolis Salute (1937)
 Bringing Up Baby (1938)
 The Affairs of Annabel (1938)
 Mr. Doodle Kicks Off (1938)
 Annabel Takes a Tour (1938)
 Next Time I Marry (1938)
 The Great Man Votes (1939)
 The Girl and the Gambler (1939)
 The Spellbinder (1939)
 Bad Lands (1939) (uncredited)
 Everything's on Ice (1939)
 Three Sons (1939)
 That's Right – You're Wrong (1939)
 Curtain Call (1940)
 Irene (1940)
 Dance, Girl, Dance (1940)
 No, No Nanette (1940)
 A Girl, a Guy, and a Gob (1941)
 Sunny (1941)
 Weekend for Three (1941)
 Joan of Paris (1942)
 Four Jacks and a Jill (1942)
 Mexican Spitfire Sees a Ghost (1942)
 The Big Street (1942)
 The Falcon's Brother (1942)
 Army Surgeon (1942)
 Hitler's Children (1943)
 Forever and a Day (1943) (uncredited)
 The Sky's the Limit (1943)
 Behind the Rising Sun (1943)
 Around the World (1943)
 Tender Comrade (1943)
 Seven Days Ashore (1944)
 The Master Race (1944)
 Music in Manhattan (1944)
 Betrayal from the East (1945)
 It's in the Bag! (1945)
 The Story of G.I. Joe (1945)
 Pardon My Past (1945)
 Whistle Stop (1946)
 Breakfast in Hollywood (1946)
 The Stranger (1946)
 The Perfect Marriage (1946)
 The Private Affairs of Bel Ami (1947)
 Ivy (1947)
 Ride the Pink Horse (1947)
 A Woman's Vengeance (1947)
 Arch of Triumph (1948)
 All My Sons (1948)
 Mr. Peabody and the Mermaid (1948)
 You Gotta Stay Happy (1948)
 Kiss the Blood Off My Hands (1948)
 We Were Strangers (1949)
 The Lady Gambles (1949)
 Bagdad (1949)
 Buccaneer's Girl (1950)
 Sierra (1950)
 Curtain Call at Cactus Creek (1950)
 Peggy (1950)
 The Desert Hawk (1950)
 Wyoming Mail (1950)
 Katie Did It (1950)
 Up Front (1951)
 Little Egypt (1951)
 The Golden Horde (1951)
 The Raging Tide (1951)
 Flame of Araby (1951)
 The Treasure of Lost Canyon (1952)
 Scarlet Angel (1952)
 The World in His Arms (1952)
 Yankee Buccaneer (1952)
 Because of You (1952)
 Against All Flags (1952)
 Seminole (1953)
 It Happens Every Thursday (1953)
 Take Me to Town (1953)
 The Man from the Alamo (1953)
 Veils of Bagdad (1953)
 Tumbleweed (1953)
 Taza, Son of Cochise (1954)
 Magnificent Obsession (1954)
 Naked Alibi (1954)
 Four Guns to the Border (1954)
 The Sign of the Pagan (1954)
 Crashout (1955)
 Man Without a Star (1955)
 Cult of the Cobra (1955)
 The Man from Bitter Ridge (1955)
 There's Always Tomorrow (1956)
 All That Heaven Allows (1956)
 Miracle in the Rain (1956)
 Congo Crossing (1956)
 Written on the Wind (1956)
 Battle Hymn (1957)
 Mister Cory (1957)
 Man Afraid (1957)
 The Midnight Story (1957)
 Man of a Thousand Faces (1957)
 The Female Animal (1958)
 Touch of Evil (1958)
 A Time to Love and a Time to Die (1958)
 The Thing That Couldn't Die (1958)
 Step Down to Terror (1958)
 Monster on the Campus (1958)
 Imitation of Life (1959)
 This Earth is Mine (1959)
 Platinum High School (1960)
 Portrait in Black (1960)
 Spartacus (1960)
 Midnight Lace (1960)
 The Misfits (1961)
 By Love Possessed (1961)
 Flower Drum Song (1961)
 That Touch of Mink (1962)
 The Interns (1962)
 If a Man Answers (1962)
 Tammy and the Doctor (1963)
 The Thrill of It All (1963)
 Captain Newman, M.D. (1963)
 I'd Rather Be Rich (1964)
 Bus Riley's Back in Town (1965)
 The Art of Love (1965)
 The War Lord (1965)
 Madame X (1966)
 The Appaloosa (1966)
 Texas Across the River (1966)
 Thoroughly Modern Millie (1967)
 Rough Night in Jericho (1967)
 Counterpoint (1968)
 The Secret War of Harry Frigg (1968)
 Madigan (1968)
 The Pink Jungle (1968)
 Eye of the Cat (1969)
 Change of Habit (1969)
 How Do I Love Thee? (1970)
 Tribes (1970)
 The Omega Man (1971)
 Ben (1972)
 Cancel My Reservation (1972)

Accolades

Wins
 Academy Awards: Oscar, Best Cinematography, Color, for Spartacus (1961).

Nominations
 Laurel Awards: Golden Laurel, Top Cinematography – Color, for Imitation of Life 5th place; 1959.
 Academy Awards: Oscar, Best Cinematography, Color, for Flower Drum Song; 1962.
 Emmy Awards: Tribes; 1970–1971.
 Emmy Awards: The Waltons; 1972–1973.

References

External links
 
 
 Russell Metty biographical essay at Turner Classic Movies by Lorraine LoBianco
 Russell Metty at the Internet Encyclopedia of Cinematographers (Rotterdam, The Netherlands)

1906 births
1978 deaths
American cinematographers
Best Cinematographer Academy Award winners